Uncial 0240 (in the Gregory-Aland numbering), is a Greek uncial manuscript of the New Testament. Palaeographically it has been assigned to the 5th century.

Description 
The codex contains a small part of the Epistle to Titus 1:4-8, on one parchment leaf (26 cm by 22 cm). The text is written in two columns per page, 23 lines per page, in uncial letters.

It is a palimpsest. The upper text is written in Georgian, it contains a menologion.

Currently it is dated by the INTF to the 5th century.

The manuscript was added to the list of the New Testament manuscripts by Kurt Aland in 1956.

It was examined by Pasquale Orsini.

Text 
The Greek text of this codex is a representative of the Alexandrian text-type. Aland placed it in Category II.

Location 
Currently the codex is housed at the Georgian National Center of Manuscripts (2123, ff. 191, 198) in Tbilisi.

See also 

 List of New Testament uncials
 Textual criticism

References

Further reading 

 Bruce M. Metzger, A Hitherto Neglected Early Fragment of the Epistle to Titus, Nov T 3 (Leiden, 1956), pp. 149-150.
 G. Zereteli, Un palimpseste grec du Ve siècle sur parchemin (Epist. ad Fit. [sic] 1.4-6,7-9), Académie royale de Belgique: Bulletin de la classe des lettres Ve, sér. 18 (1932), pp. 427-432.
 Kurt Treu, Die Griechischen Handschriften des Neuen Testaments in der USSR; eine systematische Auswertung des Texthandschriften in Leningrad, Moskau, Kiev, Odessa, Tbilisi und Erevan, T & U 91 (Berlin: 1966), pp. 353-354.

Greek New Testament uncials
Palimpsests 
5th-century biblical manuscripts